Thai political crisis may refer to:
1970s peasant revolts in Thailand
2005–06 Thai political crisis, a series of events that led to a military coup and the removal of Thaksin Shinawatra from power
2008 Thai political crisis, protests against the government of Samak Sundaravej by the People's Alliance for Democracy
2009 Thai political unrest, protests against the government of Abhisit Vejjajiva
2010 Thai political protests, protests against the government of Abhisit Vejjajiva
2013–14 Thai political crisis, protests against the government of Yingluck Shinawatra by the PDRC
2020–21 Thai protests, protests against the government of Prayut Chan-o-cha

See also
History of Thailand since 2001, an overview of the entire period